The left marginal artery (or obtuse marginal artery) is a branch of the circumflex artery, originating at the left atrioventricular sulcus, traveling along the left margin of heart towards the apex of the heart.

See also
 Right marginal branch of right coronary artery

Additional images

External links
  - "Heart: The Left Coronary Artery and its Branches"
  - "Posterior view of the heart."
 
 Image at texheartsurgeons.com
 Overview and diagrams at cardiologysite.com

Arteries of the thorax